The Mont Blanc massif is a mountain range in the Alps, located mostly in France and Italy, but also straddling Switzerland at its northeastern end. It is named after Mont Blanc, the highest point in western Europe and the European Union. Because of its considerable overall altitude, a large proportion of the massif is covered by glaciers, which include the Mer de Glace and the Miage Glacierthe longest glaciers in France and Italy, respectively.

The massif forms a watershed between the vast catchments of the rivers Rhône and Po, and a tripoint between France, Italy and Switzerland; it also marks the border between two climate regions by separating the northern and western Alps from the southern Alps. The mountains of the massif consist mostly of granite and gneiss rocks and at high altitudes the vegetation is an arctic-alpine flora.

The valleys that delimit the massif were used as communication routes by the Romans until they left around the 5th century AD. The region remained of some military importance through to the mid-20th century. A peasant farming economy operated within these valleys for many centuries until the glaciers and mountains were "discovered" by the outside world in the 18th century. Word of these impressive sights began to spread, and Mont Blanc was first climbed in 1786, marking the start of the sport of mountaineering. The region is now a major tourist destination, drawing in over sixmillion visitors per year. It provides a wide range of opportunities for outdoor recreation and activities such as sight-seeing, hiking, rock climbing, mountaineering and skiing. Around one hundred people a year die across its mountains and, occasionally, bodies have been lost and entombed in its glaciers for decades.

Access into the mountains is facilitated by cable cars, mountain railways and mountain huts which offer overnight refuge to climbers and skiers. The Mont Blanc Tunnel connects the French town of Chamonix on the northern side with the Italian town of Courmayeur in the south. The high mountains have provided many opportunities for scientific research, including neutrino measurements within the tunnel and impact of climate change on its highest slopes. Recent rises in average temperatures have led to significant glacial retreat across the massif and an awareness of the need for better environmental protection, including a call for World Heritage Site status.

Geography

The northwestern side of the massif lies mostly within France, and is bounded by the valley of the Arve, containing the towns of Argentière, Chamonix and Les Houches. To the west it is bounded by the Val Montjoie, containing Les Contamines-Montjoie and the river Le Bon Nant which flows northwards to a confluence with the Arve near Saint-Gervais-les-Bains, and onwards to the Rhône.

The southern side of the massif lies mostly within Italy and is bounded by the Val Veny and Val Ferret whose watercourses meet just above Courmayeur. From Courmayeur these waters flow southwards as the Dora Baltea towards Aosta, eventually joining the Po. However, the extreme western end of the southern side of the massif does lie within France and is bounded by the Vallée des Glaciers (which connects to the Val Veny over the watershed of the col de la Seigne), and its waters flow southwards towards the Isère and onwards to the Rhône.

The northernmost section of the massif falls within Switzerland, and is bounded to the east by a separate valley, confusingly also called Val Ferret, and which separates it from the Pennine Alps. Its watercourse, la Dranse de Ferret, flows northwards to join the Rhône at Martigny. The west side of the northern end of the massif is drained by the Trient, also joining the Rhône near Martigny.

From here the border turns southwards over the Dômes de Miage and Aiguille de Tré la Tête before dropping down to the Col de la Seigne. North of Mont Dolent the border between France and Switzerland meanders roughly north-northwestwards along a ridge-line of slightly lower peaks, including the Aiguille d'Argentière, the Aiguille du Chardonnet and the Aiguille du Tour, before dropping down to the Col de Balme. The Swiss – Italian border runs southwest from Mont Dolent, down to the twin passes of Col Ferret.

Crowning the massif is Mont Blanc, the highest mountain in the Alps and in western Europe. From the summit of Mont Blanc to the Arve near Chamonix there is a  drop in altitude over a distance of just . Because of its great elevation, much of the massif is snow- and ice-covered, and has been deeply dissected by glaciers. The Mer de Glace is the longest glacier in the range as well as the longest in France and the second longest in the Alps. The debris-covered Miage Glacier on the southern side of the massif is the longest in Italy.
The summit of Mont Blanc is an ice cap whose thickness varies from year to year.

It usually takes around 11 days to complete, but is also used for an annual mountain ultramarathon, with top competitors expected to complete the whole route in less than 21 hours.

The main mountain passes, or cols, that connect different valleys and towns around the Mont Blanc massif are:
Col du Bonhomme  (path, links Contamines – Beaufort – Les Chapieux)
Col de la Seigne  (path, links Bourg Saint Maurice – Les Chapieux – Courmayeur)
Col Ferret  (path, links Courmayeur – Orsières)
Col de Champex  and La Forclaz, or Fenêtre d'Arpette  (path and road, links Orsières - Trient Valley)
Col de Balme  (path, links Trient Valley – Chamonix)
Col de la Forclaz  (major road, links Chamonix – Martigny)

Summits

These (including Mont Blanc) are shared between Italy and France only, the highest in Switzerland being the Aiguille d'Argentière. The massif is amongst the three major subranges of the Alps having the highest concentration of four-thousanders, together with the Pennine Alps and the Bernese Alps.

The first ascent of Mont Blanc in 1786 by Jacques Balmat and Michel Paccard initiated the sport of alpine mountaineering, and it was during the golden age of alpinism (185465) and the silver age of alpinism (186582) that the majority of the main summits of the massif were first attained. Members of the England-based Alpine Club were instrumental in many of the first ascents, usually accompanied by guides from Chamonix or Courmayeur, such as Michel Croz, Michel Payot and Émile Rey, as well as the Swiss guide, Christian Almer. Across the massif there are now more than two thousand different mountaineering routes to the summits, ranging greatly in both length and difficulty. These attract climbers from all over the world who, unlike the early ascensionists, now have access to numerous climbing guidebooks, modern safety equipment, good information on climbing routes and technical difficulty, as well as weather forecasts and mountain accommodation and food.

Glaciers

A wide range of glaciers and glacial structures can be found across the Mont Blanc massif, all of which can be easily reached or viewed. Glaciers cover  of the massif, of which  fall within France. The Mer de Glace is the largest glacier in the western Alps, and the second largest in Europe.

Other large glaciers include the Argentière Glacier, the Saleina Glacier, Trient Glacier, the Bossons Glacier and the Brenva Glacier. Whilst these glaciers appear to show similar fluctuations in length, research shows that each glacier of the Mont Blanc massif has its own individual and distinctive response time to changes in snowfall and climate. The Bossons Glacier is known to respond first, then the Argentière and the Trient Glaciers respond four to seven years later, with the Mer de Glace reacting last —between eleven and fifteen years after changes are first observed in the movement of ice in the Bossons Glacier.

Even the smallest glaciers can have a significant impact on the environment and on human activity. In 1892, a large body of water which had accumulated under the surface of the Tête Rousse Glacier, burst suddenly on the night of 11 July. It released  of water and ice which flowed down the mountainside, killing 175 people in Saint-Gervais. The recent rediscovery of a further build-up of water deep within the glacier is now a cause of serious concern.

The inexorable downward movement and melting of glaciers can result in objects lost within them reappearing many years later. 
The first recorded account of a body reappearing from a glacier in the Mont Blanc range was made by Viscount Edmond de Catelin in 1861. Forty years later the remains of two of them were discovered, re-exposed within fissures in the Bossons glacier. They were  lower down from the point where they were lost; the corpse of the third guide was discovered the following year. In 2014, a group of climbers found a body on the Glacier du Talèfre, close to the Couvercle Hut. It was identified as that of a young Chamonix guide who had been caught in a winter storm during a solo ascent of the Nant Blanc face of the Aiguille Verte in 1982 and was assumed to have fallen into a crevasse. In 2013, a box of valuable gemstones was found by a climber on the Bossons Glacier. It had re-emerged, having been carried  downhill from the site of one of two Air India plane crashes. These occurred at almost identical locations high up near the summit of Mont Blanc: one in 1950 (Air India Flight 245), and one in 1966 (Air India Flight 101). Debris from these crashes is still commonly found on the glacier below.

Geology

The Mont Blanc massif consists predominantly of ancient granite rocks. The Alps have their origins 770million years ago when upheaval of the earth's crust lifted up schist, gneiss and limestone rocks. These were destined to form the base of the Alps range, and this period of upheaval ended 300million years ago. Granite intrusions and associated metamorphic rocks formed the base of the mountains we now call the Mont Blanc massif as well as the nearby Aiguilles Rouges. But these rocks were then heavily eroded away,  eventually being ground down and inundated by the sea, so allowing sedimentary rocks to form. Then, once again, this part of the earth's crust was uplifted as a result of the collision of continental plates. The huge mountain ranges of today's Alps began to form. This happened towards the end of the Tertiary period, 15million years ago. Finally, came the Quaternary era, when successive ice ages saw vast glaciers advance, retreat, and then advance again. Their movement across the landscape ground down and shaped the mountains and the valleys we see today.

Both the Mont Blanc massif, and the Aiguilles Rouges range to its north, now form part of the external zone of the Alps, effectively being the outermost layers of rock. The central granites make up Mont Blanc, the steep slopes of the Drus, the Grandes Jorasses and the Dent du Géant, and at the highest points are topped by schists, which are visible in places such as Grands Montets and near Mont Blanc's summit.

The granite mountains around Chamonix have been eroded into steep needle-shaped peaks (known as ). Known locally as protogine, these rocks are lower in the mineral biotite mica and richer in quartz than the granites commonly found elsewhere.

A large part of the massif is covered by ice fields and is cut by numerous glaciers, mostly flowing northwestwards on the French side; southeastwards on the Italian side and eastwards on the Swiss side. With much steeper slopes on the Italian side, many glaciers drop very sharply and some, such as the Miage Glacier and the Brenva Glacier, are very heavily covered in rock debris. The massif is itself defined by broad valleys which formed along fault lines and which have subsequently been shaped by ice during the last glacial period of the ice age.

During the mid-19th century the granite of the Mont Blanc massif was an important source of stone for buildings; one hundred Italian stonemasons were brought to the Chamonix valley by Charles Albert of Sardinia for reconstructing the towns of Sallanches and Cluses, both of which had at that time just been destroyed by fires.

Minerals

The massif has been an important source of mineral specimens for crystal-hunters for over 250 years. The mountaineer and explorer, Edward Whymper, noted that the basin of the Glacier de Talèfre was "considered good hunting-ground for crystals", and that the slopes below les Courtes had yielded many large specimens.
The first systematic account of the minerals of the Mont Blanc area was published in 1873 by Venance Payot. His list, entitled "Statistique minéralogique des environs du Mt-Blanc", catalogued 90 mineral types although it also included those present only as very small components of rocks. If these are excluded, it is known today that at least 68 separate mineral species occur across the whole range of the Mont Blanc massif.

In order to preserve the mineralogical heritage of Mont Blanc, in 2008 the commune of Chamonix banned all mineral-hunting activities and collection of specimens without a prior permit being issued by the mayor's office. Use of explosives, heavy machinery or helicopters for removing material were also banned, and a code of practice put in place which requires an annual declaration of all finds to be made. It also gives a right for the Chamonix crystal museum (Musée des Cristaux) to have first option to acquire specimens of significance for its collections. To further protect the scientific value of material collected, all specimens offered for sale must be labelled with details of where they were found. The crystal museum opened to the public in 2006 and tells the story of the early crystal-hunters (known as ). Many specimens collected from across the massif are displayed there.

Climate

Located on the watershed between the Rhône and the Po, the Mont Blanc massif is also situated between the two different climatic regions of the northern and western Alps and that of the southern Alps. Climatic conditions on the Mer de Glace are similar to those found on the northern side of the Swiss Alps.

The climate of the Mont Blanc massif is cold and temperate (Köppen climate classification Cfb), and is greatly influenced by altitude. The greatest snowfall occurs between the months of November and April.

The best weather for mountaineering or hiking occurs between late June to early October but, being the highest part of the Alps, the Mont Blanc massif can create its own weather patterns. The summit is also prone to strong winds and sudden weather changes. Because of the massif's great overall height, a considerable proportion is permanently glaciated or snow-covered and is exposed to extremely cold conditions.

Precipitation is distributed fairly evenly over all months of the year, and mostly originates from a westerly airflow. There is, however, significant variation in precipitation with altitude.

In the mountains further south of the Mont Blanc range, annual precipitation is significantly less than at equivalent altitudes within the massif.

Ecology

The massif contains a very rich variety of biodiversity as a result of the huge height range and different habitats found between the valleys and the highest summits.

Whilst the Mont Blanc massif does not contain any species that are endemic to it, there are many rare and legally protected species found within its four major habitat zones. These are the: montane forests, sub-alpine, alpine and nival zones. The major habitats are coniferous forests, moors, rock and talus slopes, plus glacial moraines. The biological richness is further influenced by the different aspects of the faces, by the geology, and by the influence of man on the lower and middle slopes where forest clearance has created open grassland. The native forest habitats are essential for the survival of many species, with the key conifer species including larch, pine, stone pine and red pine.

Flora
Over a thousand plant species have been recorded across the massif, from the valley bottoms right up to  where the alpine chrysanthemum can be found at a record-breaking height.

Early explorers, such as Alexander von Humboldt in 1807, observed a number of notable species in the mountains around Mont Blanc at altitudes above . This was well above the permanent snow line, but on rocks that were so steep that little snow could rest. These arctic-alpine species included: ; ; ; Cardamine bellidifolia; Draba hirta;   and Silene acaulis (occurring down to ). Between , Humboldt noted the following species of flowering plants amongst rocky debris around permanent snow fields and the highest alpine glaciers: ; Achillea atrata; Gentiana nivalis; Juncus trifidus; Ranunculus glacialis;  and Saxifraga oppositifolia.

In the mid-1800s, Venance Payot, a Chamonix naturalist, published a number of articles on the flora around the Mont Blanc area, including a list of the flowering plants, ferns mosses and lichens found at les Grands Mulets and elsewhere in the massif around Chamonix and the Aosta Valley.

High up in the middle of the Glacier de Talèfre, completely surrounded by ice, and due south of Les Droites, lies a large triangular region of steep mountainside containing an unusual mixture of high-alpine vegetation. Known as the Jardin de Talèfre, its name derives from the rich assemblage of plants which occur at great altitude there (between ). Described as "one of the loftiest patches of vegetation in Europe upon an islet of rock in the midst of a wilderness of snow and ice", it is higher than the adjacent ground by tens of metres and, as a result, was spared glacial scouring and subsequent loss of its vegetation during the Little Ice Age (between 1300 and 1850). Nevertheless, it would at that time still have been surrounded by ice on all three sides, as evidenced by the three glacial moraines found there today. 
Species recorded there include: 
Achillea nana; 
Alchemilla pentaphylla; 
; 
Arenaria serpyllifolia; 
Cardamine alpina; 
Draba frigida; 
Empetrum nigrum; 
Epilobium alpinum; 
; 
Homogyne alpina; 
Jacobaea incana; 
Juncus trifidus; 
Kalmia procumbens; 
; 
; 
Ranunculus glacialis; 
; 
Saxifraga aspera; 
Saxifraga bryoides; 
Saxifraga oppositifolia; 
; 
Sibbaldia procumbens and 
Trifolium alpinum.

It was originally created in 1987 just as a tourist attraction but, with the subsequent designation of the adjacent Pavillon du Mont Frety as a protected area, it has since increased in scientific importance. The botanical garden derives its name from the genus of mountain flowers, Saussurea (Saw-worts) which itself was named after Horace-Bénédict de Saussure, whose enthusiasm for scientific research in the mountains led to the first ascent of Mont Blanc in 1786.

Fauna

The mountains around Mont Blanc are home to many mammal species, including ibex, chamois, deer, mountain hare and alpine marmot (including a small population of albino marmots within Val Ferret). Eurasian lynx have been reintroduced into the French Alps and, although present around the Mont Blanc massif, are extremely unlikely to be encountered.

Over 80 different bird species have been recorded on the Italian side of the massif from within Val Ferret, including 63 nesting species and nine regional or national rarities. The following birds have been recorded in different habitats right across the Mont Blanc massif:
Valleys and lower pastures: Blackbird; carrion crow; chaffinch; goldfinch; great tit; house martin; house sparrow; nuthatch; robin; swallow; song thrush; whinchat; yellowhammer.
Rivers: Dipper; wagtails.
Forests: Coal tit; crested tit; jay; marsh tit; mistle thrush; nutcracker; willow tit.
Above tree line: Alpine accentor; alpine chough; bearded vulture (rare); black redstart; citril finch; meadow pipit; ptarmigan; common redstart; snowfinch; wallcreeper; wheatear.
Raptors: Buzzard; golden eagle; honey buzzard; kestrel; peregrine falcon; sparrowhawk.

Seven of the massif's largest indigenous mammal species are housed in the Merlet Animal Park near Les Houches, including ibex, chamois, marmot, fallow and roe deer.

Human history

Early history
The region in which the Mont Blanc massif is located has been occupied by humans for at least 70,000 years, although, as now—and because of the great height and glaciated nature of the mountains—only the lower parts of the valleys around its perimeter would have been inhabited or used as routes of communication.

The Romans, who occupied the region 2,000 years ago, used the main valleys around the massif for military purposes. They gave the name Alpes Penninae, or  Poeninae, to the highest parts of the Alpswhich extended from Mont Blanc to Monte Rosa. They took over Aosta from the Salassi Celtic tribe in 25 AD and engineered roads which extended northwards into Europe via the Great St Bernard Pass and the Little St Bernard Pass. Courmayeur, on the southern side of the massif, began to develop as a stop-off along their trans-alpine trading routes between Italy and France. Parts of the modern Tour du Mont Blanc walking trail still follow the route of a Roman road along the Col du Bonhomme and the Col de la Seigne.

The Romans occupied Martigny to the north of the massif, and their influence spread out well beyond the Alps into much of northern Europe. As a result of aggressive pressure from tribes in the north, the imperial forces of Rome were gradually withdrawn from the alpine regions until, by the 5th century AD, they had left completely. The areas left behind were occupied in the western part by the Burgundian tribes from what is today France, whilst the Alemanni tribes from Germany moved into eastern parts, resulting in the linguistic divide found today across the Alps.

For many centuries thereafter, the settlements around the Mont Blanc massif comprised a rural population of peasant mountain farmers, living off animal husbandry, supplemented with a meagre harvest of rye and oats. Some farmers in the valley of Chamonix joined their counterparts from the neighbouring valleys of Maurienne, Beaufortain and Tarentaise and crossed the Alps into southern Germany, Austria and northern Italy to sell their products and bring back goods for sale in local markets.

Tourist beginnings

In 1741, the Chamouny valley and its glaciers on the north side of the massif were discovered and written about by two aristocratic travelling Englishmen, named William Windham and Richard Pococke. The descriptions of their exploits were published across Europe, bringing the mountains of the Mont Blanc range to the attention of a wide audience for the first time. In 1760, Horace-Bénédict de Saussure offered a large financial prize to the first people who successfully ascended Mont Blanc. The summit was finally attained on 8 August 1786 by two Chamonix men, the guide Jacques Balmat and Dr. Michel Paccard. The decades that followed saw the gradual opening up of Chamonix to the world, as well as the rest of the Mont Blanc massif. The many published accounts of climbs and impressive sights amongst or around the mountain range attracted numerous wealthy and notable visitors, for whom a visit to marvel at the Sea of Ice (the Mer de Glace) became a fashionable thing to experience.

In July 1816, Mary Shelley and Percy Bysshe Shelley toured the Alps and visited Chamouni (as it was then known), as well as the Mer de Glace and the Bossons Glacier. They jointly published their accounts and letters in a work entitled: History of a Six Weeks' Tour through a part of France, Switzerland, Germany, and Holland; with Letters Descriptive of a Sail Round the Lake of Geneva and of the Glaciers of Chamouni. The book concludes with Mont Blanc, a 144-line poem by Percy Shelley, written whilst in Chamonix and which was inspired by the river Arve, the snow-covered summits, the chaotic glaciers and the forests that he experienced during their visit.

Amongst many other notable visitors were: Goethe (1779); Chateaubriand (1805); Madame de Staël; Victor Hugo; Louis Pasteur and Franz Liszt (1836), plus two successive wives of Napoleon Bonaparte: Joséphine de Beauharnais (1810) and Marie Louise of Austria (1814). In 1849, John Ruskin spent a month in Chamonix, from where he painted some of the massif's mountains before undertaking the Tour of Mont Blanc. When Savoy was eventually annexed to France in 1860, Napoleon III and Empress Eugénie visited the region to mark the event and undertook to enhance road access leading to the end of the Arve valley.

The 19th century saw considerable economic development which turned the small agricultural town of Chamonix into a base for tourists, with luxurious hotels and mountain lodges being built to accommodate them. A trade in selling local items to visiting foreigners soon developed. Crystals collected from across the massif were much in demand, as were locally produced goods such as horn trinkets and honey.

In just 50 years the Mont Blanc massif, and Chamonix and Courmayeur in particular, had become a popular destination for many travellers, and its economy changed from 80% agriculture to 80% tourism. It saw the emergence and spread of the sport of alpine mountaineering, and visitor numbers increased significantly. By the end of the 18th century, Chamonix was home to around 1,500 summer visitors. By 1850 it was welcoming 5,000 visitors, and by 1892 those numbers had risen to 24,000 a year. In 1906, the eleventh edition of a guidebook written by Edward Whymper about Chamonix and the Mont Blanc range estimated that 130,000 visitors had gone there during the previous season. It also reported that the railway service to Chamonix, which had previously been suspended in winter, was now running throughout the year. The tourist boom to the mountains had started. In 1924, a Winter Sports Week was held in Chamonix, with patronage from the International Olympic Committee. It attracted over 10,000 paying visitors and was retrospectively named as the first Winter Olympic Games.

Modern tourism

The Mont Blanc massif is now a significant tourist destination. The region attracts over sixmillion people per annum, with around one in five gaining access to its slopes by means of mechanical infrastructure (cable cars or funicular railways). Some surveys have shown that tourists mostly come to the Mont Blanc massif and its environs for winter sports such as skiing as well as summer outdoor activities like hiking, climbing and cycling.

The Aiguille du Midi Cable Car in Chamonix attracts 500,000 people each year and gives views over much of the massif, and up towards Mont Blanc itself.

The building of the new Skyway Monte Bianco cable car on the Italian side of the massif is expected to increase visitor numbers to Courmayeur from 100,000 to 300,000 per annum, following complete replacement of an earlier cable car system in 2015. It takes tourists from La Palud up to the Torino Hut at its top on Pointe Helbronner.
Costing over 105million euros, the Skyway Monte Bianco is regarded as the world's most expensive cable car installation.

Other recent enhancements to tourist infrastructure across the massif have included construction of a new, and ultra-modern Goûter Hut to accommodate the increasing numbers of mountaineers attempting the popular Goûter Route to the summit of Mont Blanc, and investment of ½ billion euros in Les Grands Montets and other ski areas over a six-year period from 2014 onwards.

Increasing numbers of mountain tourists, ease of access into the high mountain environment, plus promotion and encouragement by tour companies offering ascents of Mont Blanc to people with little or no previous alpine experience, have led to an increase in mountain accidents and even inappropriate demands to be rescued. With up to 30,000 climbing parties now attempting to ascend Mont Blanc each year, it has gained the reputation of being one of the world's deadliest mountains. Deaths from mountaineering-related accidents across the Mont Blanc massif average almost 100 a year, with the majority occurring on Mont Blanc itself. There have also been various stunts, some of which the local authorities have called reckless or stupid. In recent years, guards have been placed on the most popular route of ascent to Mont Blanc's summit at peak periods in order to ensure that those entering the mountain environment are adequately equipped and skilled. This has led to calls to limit access to the most popular summits and for the mountains to be treated with greater respect.

Scientific research
The Mont Blanc massif has provided numerous opportunities for academic research, dating back to the very first ascent of Mont Blanc in 1786 during which Michel Paccard carried scientific equipment to confirm it as the highest summit. In 1820, an ill-fated expedition led by Dr Hamel included pigeons intended for release at varying altitudes to measure the impact of reduced air density on their ability to fly. One study involved taking simultaneous temperature measurements made over many months at Chamonix, the Grands Mulets and at the observatory itself. In 1893, Pierre Janssen constructed an astronomical observatory on the top of Mont Blanc, partially buried within the summit ice to hold it in place. A  telescope and a spectrograph for measuring the oxygen content of the sun were installed. The observatory was removed when it started to collapse around 1906.
Three examples of modern-day uses of the high mountains for scientific research include neutrino detection, uranium pollution monitoring and climate change:

A neutrino detector was installed deep inside the Mont Blanc Tunnel in the early‑1980s in order to take advantage of the shielding from background radiation provided by the 4,800 meter water equivalent (m.w.e.) of solid rock surrounding it in every direction. In February 1987, the underground neutrino observatory reported the detection of a neutrino event, believed to have originated from the explosion of the SN 1987A supernova.
In 2005, the technique of remote laser-scanning (LiDAR) was used for the first time in any mountain environment to research the impact of climate change on rock face stability. Seven sites in the Mont Blanc massif were selected, with the Tour Ronde being the first to be analysed. This revealed that over a twelve-month period the face had lost  of rock. The project concluded that the high rockfall rate on the Tour Ronde and elsewhere in the massif was linked to the degradation of permafrost. This would formerly have held the mountain together more effectively, but it is now exposed to greater weathering through the freeze-thaw cycle of water, with maximum occurrence during warm summers. In 2015, climbers captured video footage of a huge rockfall on the Tour Ronde's east face, which suggests that instability continues in this area.
In 2001, researchers from France, Italy and Korea published the results of a study into uranium contamination of the wider environment by wind-borne particles. It produced an accurate timeline of contamination levels going back 200 years and was the first published uranium concentration data for any alpine or polar icefield. Ice that pre-dated 1940 was shown to contain fairly uniform and low levels of uranium, consistent with natural background contamination. In contrast, ice that had been laid down after World War II showed large excesses. These were attributed to aerial transport of uranium dust, produced by extensive mining and milling operations that occurred in East Germany (and also in France to a lesser extent) between 1965 and the end of the 1980s. No evidence was found that either the 1986 Chernobyl disaster or other nuclear power plants had caused the high levels of observed uranium contamination.

Modern military history

A troop garrison, known as the Casermetta, was active for many years at the Col de la Seigne, on the border between France and Italy.
In the 1930s, during a period of increased international tension, the Mont Blanc massif was used by both countries wanting to demonstrate their military might, and large drills and troop exercises were undertaken at high altitude. During World War II, at a time when the French army had already been defeated by Nazi Germany, France found itself under attack again, but this time by Italian soldiers in many alpine locations including the area around the Col de la Seigne. Evidence of past fortifications and old firing points are still visible throughout the area

Towards the end of World War II, the highest engagement of the entire war occurred on the glaciers above Chamonix. With the Germans nearly defeated, and their garrison in Chamonix surrounded by the liberating forces, a contingent of Austro-German soldier—who were based around the Torino Hut on the Italian side of the massif—launched a dawn bombardment on Chamonix from positions adjacent to the cable car station on the Col du Midi. Nine of the attacking soldiers were killed, including their commander.

By 1932 France had established the École de Haute Montagne in Chamonix to train mountain troops, but in 1945 it was reconstituted to provide specialised mountaineering training, skiing and tactical skills to the entire army.

Incidents and tragedies
A number of noteworthy incidents have occurred across the massif over the last two centuries which stand out from the routine toll of mountain-related deaths, of which there are now approximately 100 per annum.

 1820: First recorded deaths on Mont Blanc. Three Chamoniards die in a climbing group led by Dr Hamel.
 1892: 175 people are killed in St Gervais and nearby settlements from the sudden release of meltwater from the Tête Rousse Glacier.
 1895: Italian mountain guide, Émile Rey, dies during simple descent from Dent du Geant.
 1946: A B-17 Flying Fortress crashes into the Aiguille des Glaciers. All eight crew are killed.
 1950: Air India Flight 245 crashes close to summit of Mont Blanc. All 48 passengers and crew are killed.
 1961: French jet fighter plane severs cable on Vallée Blanche Cable Car, killing six tourists and leaving 59 trapped.
 1966 Air India Flight 101 crashes close to summit of Mont Blanc. All 106 passengers and 11 crew are killed.
 1997: British mountain guide is successfully sued by six-year-old boy over father's death in a climbing accident on the Tour Ronde in 1990.
 1999: Avalanche kills 12 people and destroys 17 houses in villages of Le Tour and Montroc - the worst incident in Chamonix for 90 years. 
 1999: A lorry fire in the Mont Blanc Tunnel kills 39 people.
 2012: Ice fall triggers avalanche on Mont Maudit, affecting 28 climbers. Nine climbers killed, nine others injured.

Access

The Mont Blanc massif is accessible by road from within France via the A40–E25, or from Switzerland via Martigny and the Forclaz pass, or via Orsières to reach the Swiss Val Ferret. From within Italy the A40 from Aosta leads to Courmayeur, as does the higher mountain route from Bourg-Saint-Maurice via the Col du Petit St. Bernard.

The French and Swiss sides of the massif are linked since 1908 with a narrow-gauge railway running from Saint-Gervais to Martigny, via Chamonix and Finhaut. It is constituted by the Saint-Gervais–Vallorcine section and the Martigny–Châtelard section. Trains running on the line are called Mont Blanc Express.

The massif can be quickly crossed in a north–south direction by one of two transport routes, one aimed at through-traffic, the other intended solely for tourists:
It took twenty years to complete and opened to vehicle traffic in 1965. The tunnel is known for an incident in March 1999, when a lorry caught alight inside; the resulting fire lasted 53 hours and killed 39 people. The tunnel was renovated in the aftermath, re-opening three years later. By 2008, 1,600 trucks and 3,200 cars were using the tunnel every day (1.8million vehicles per year) – a little less than before the 1999 fire.
 The Vallée Blanche Cable Car is normally used by visitors travelling from one or other of the tourist centres of Chamonix or Courmayeur and gives views over the glaciated regions of the massif. It crosses the massif in a roughly north–south direction and connects the Aiguille du Midi with the Point Helbronner, each of which can themselves be reached by téléphérique from Chamonix and Courmayeur, respectively.

Elsewhere in the massif, the Montenvers Railway connects Chamonix to Montenvers near the foot of the Mer de Glace, whilst the Téléphérique du Lognan connects Argentière with Aiguille des Grands Montets, where Les Grand Montets is an important winter skiing area in the region. At , the summit station also provides relatively easy access for climbers to the northeastern peaks of the range, including short introductory rock scrambles and a simple ice-face route on the NW face of the Petite Aiguille Verte.

The Mont Blanc Tramway takes tourists and hikers from Saint-Gervais to the Nid d'Aigle, near the Glacier de Bionnassay. It also provides mountaineers with ready access to the first stage of the Goûter Route for an attempt on the most popular route to the summit of Mont Blanc.

From Les Houches, one of two cable cars links to Bellevue plateau, giving access to walking paths, mountain bike trails and winter ski-runs as well as to a halt on the Mont Blanc Tramway, A second links the town to the adjacent Prarion plateau.

Heli-skiing gives ready access to many remote or off-piste ski routes in the Mont Blanc massif. Because heli-skiing is banned across France for environmental reasons, companies offering this service only operate on the Swiss and Italian sides of the range.

Mountain huts

Since the very early days of alpine mountaineering a number of high-altitude mountain refuges have been positioned strategically across the massif to give climbers easier access to the high summits by permitting an overnight stay. The majority are owned by national mountaineering clubs, and many are wardened during the summer months, although the smaller bivouac huts are unmanned and have very basic facilities.

Those on the most popular routes, such as the Goûter Hut, now require all climbers to pre-book. Some tiny huts, such as the remote Eccles Hut, can also be extremely crowded during good mountaineering weather, and some climbers prefer to bivouac outside.

Environmental protection

Weather records show that since the 1960s there has been a trend of less snow at lower altitudes, whilst since the 1990s average mountain temperatures have increased more than at lower levels. Temperatures in Chamonix have risen by 1.5 °C over the last 75 years, and fresh snow build-up has halved there in the last 40 years, and there has been an increase in the melting and retreat of the massif's glaciers. In the last 20 years the glacier has been retreating at a rate of around  every year.

To help counter these effects, in 2012 the various Chamonix-Mont Blanc authorities introduced a climate and energy action plan, committing the region to a 22% reduction in its greenhouse gas emissions by 2020. The plan included proposals to improve air quality by banning those lorries from using the Mont Blanc Tunnel which were deemed to be the most polluting and which, at times, had reduced air quality to levels more usually associated with the streets of Paris.

Concerns over the state of the environment around the most popular parts of the Mont Blanc massif, and the need for visitors to better respect it, were reflected in a statement in 2014 by Jean-Marc Peillex, the mayor of Saint-Gervais, who said:Mont Blanc is a heap of garbage ... a mountain covered with the crap, urine and detritus of the last 50 years. The problems are covered up by a nice, white blanket of snow. But I want to confront people with the reality and to reach those people who abuse the mountain. Following the construction of the new Goûter Hut used by most climbers ascending Mont Blanc, the authorities now strictly enforce a 'no wild-camping' ban above the level of Tête Rousses Hut. Each high altitude hut faces its own individual challenges, often relating to water and energy supply or waste management, and the provision of services to visitors can sometimes conflict with environmental protection. A range of individual solutions for a selection of huts within the massif and elsewhere in the Alps was identified by a project run by Espace Mont Blanc between 2007 and 2013.

Espace Mont Blanc
In 1991, the environment ministers for France, Italy and Switzerland came together to agree the formation of Espace Mont Blanc – a partnership of national authorities and local communities to plan for the future development and protection of the Mont Blanc region. In 1998, the group was charged with creating a sustainable development scheme for the region (finally launched in 2005), whilst in 2003 it adopted a plan for safeguarding sensitive environments and landscapes. In 2007, it produced its position statement regarding the classification of Mont Blanc as a UNESCO World Heritage Site, and in 2009 a Transboundary Integrated Plan (PIT) was announced, with the implementation of six regional projects running until 2013. In 2014, the group launched "Strategy for the Future", which is intended to be a strategic tool for ensuring that public policies are consistent across the different territories around the Mont Blanc massif.

Protected statuses
By 1989 there had been calls for the creation of an International Park for Mont Blanc. In June 2000 France did add the Mont Blanc Massif to UNESCO's Tentative List, which is a first step to formal nomination for World Heritage Site status. This was followed in January 2008 by a cross-border submission from Italy, which included France and Switzerland. However, as of 2016, it had neither a national park designation nor UNESCO World Heritage Site status.
As a result of long delays, many environmental groups from France, Italy and Switzerland have worked together under the umbrella organisation, proMONT BLANC, to jointly raise concerns and to put pressure on national governments and the European Union to support and make quicker progress with World Heritage classification. In 2012 the organisation published a detailed assessment and supportive rationale into the state of the Mont Blanc application to be a World Heritage Site. ProMont Blanc also undertakes reviews of a suite of 24 environmental, 24 economic and 10 social indicators across 15 towns around the massif (seven French, five Italian and three Swiss), and monitors and reports on the effectiveness of measures intended to deliver sustainable development across the region.

In October 2017 representatives from all three nations finally signed a joint declaration of intent as the first formal step towards submitting a bid for the Mont Blanc massif to be a candidate for inclusion on UNESCO's World Heritage Site list.

All the French parts of the Mont Blanc massif, plus the neighbouring Aiguille Rouges range, have been listed as a Zone naturelle d'intérêt écologique, faunistique et floristique (ZNIEFF). This does not give regulatory protection, but is a recognition of the outstanding biodiversity of the area, and of its landscape, geomorphological, geological, historical and scientific importance. The 2011 schedule documents list over 150 species of animals and plants for which the massif is important. In Italy, the whole Val Ferret watershed was designated a Special Protection Area (Italian: Zone di Protezione Speciale) in 2003, and this  area now forms part of the European Union's Natura 2000 network of protected sites.

Despite these individual designations, the Mont Blanc massif as a whole is still regarded by conservationists as representing an important missing link in the wider network of protected areas of the western Alps.

See also

Compagnie des Guides de Chamonix
Haute Route

Notes

References

Further reading

External links

 Mont Blanc massif on French IGN mapping portal
 Mont Blanc massif on OpenStreetMap.org
 Mont Blanc massif on Bing aerial view
 Map of all 4000m peaks in Mont Blanc Massif
 Google StreetView on the Mont Blanc Massif
 Climate Live (above and below-ground temperature plots)
 CREA: Le Centre de Recherches sur les Ecosystèmes d'Altitude
 Espace Mont Blanc website
 proMONT BLANC website
 Retreating glaciers of Mont Blanc massif as revealed by French IGN Geoportal (YouTube video)
 The Mont Blanc massif in LEGO

 
Mountain ranges of Auvergne-Rhône-Alpes
Mountain ranges of France
Mountain ranges of Italy
Mountain ranges of Switzerland
Mountain ranges of the Alps
Mountains of Aosta Valley